Nathan Thompson may refer to:
Nathan Thompson (rapper) (born 1989), American rapper
Nathan Thompson (Australian footballer) (born 1978), Australian rules footballer
Nathan Thompson (English footballer) (born 1990), English professional footballer